Ian Milne (born 8 April 1954) is an Irish republican politician from Northern Ireland.

Background
Born in Bellaghy, County Londonderry, Milne joined the Official Irish Republican Army-linked Fianna Éireann youth group soon after its formation, but the following year moved to join the Provisional IRA.  He was gaoled in 1971, after explosives went off in a car in which he was travelling.  He was imprisoned in the Crumlin Road Jail, but escaped in January 1973.  The following year, he was arrested in the Republic of Ireland after stealing a Garda car, and was sentenced to five years in Portlaoise Prison.  However, he again escaped, and remained an active paramilitary based in Northern Ireland.

During the mid-1970s, the Royal Ulster Constabulary described Milne as one of its three "most wanted".  In 1977, he was arrested and sentenced to life for killing a British soldier.  Serving time at Long Kesh, he participated in the blanket protest.  He was released in 1992.

At the 2005 Northern Ireland local elections, Milne was elected to Magherafelt District Council for Sinn Féin, and he held his seat in 2011.  While on the council, he spent a period as chairman.  In 2013, he was co-opted to the Northern Ireland Assembly in Mid Ulster, replacing Francie Molloy. He was elected to the Northern Ireland Assembly for Mid Ulster at the 2016 Northern Ireland Assembly election.

In September 2017 Milne was served civil writs for his alleged involvement in the murder of Jimmy Speer on 9 November 1976.

In December 2018, he resigned as MLA to seek reelection to local government. He was elected to Mid Ulster District Council in 2019.

References

1954 births
Members of Magherafelt District Council
Members of Mid Ulster District Council
Irish republicans
Living people
Northern Ireland MLAs 2011–2016
Northern Ireland MLAs 2016–2017
Northern Ireland MLAs 2017–2022
People convicted of murder by Northern Ireland
People from County Londonderry
Politicians convicted of murder
Provisional Irish Republican Army members
Republicans imprisoned during the Northern Ireland conflict
Sinn Féin MLAs
Sinn Féin councillors in Northern Ireland